DYLL (94.7 FM), broadcasting as  94.7 Energy FM, is a radio station owned and operated by Ultrasonic Broadcasting System. The station's studio is located at the 3rd Floor, Gallardo Bldg., Gen. Maxilom Ave., Cebu City, and its transmitter is located at BSP Camp, Capitol Hills, Brgy. Lahug, Cebu City. This station operates 24/7.

History
The station was established in 1992 as Mellow Touch 94.7 under the ownership of FBS Radio Network, carrying an easy listening format. In 2003, it went off the air after the station building caught fire, damaging the station's equipment, transmitter, and studio. On April 12, 2004, UBSI acquired the station (and its Dagupan station) from FBS and rebranded it as 94.7 Energy FM as part of ownership swapping in return for its AM station in Mega Manila.

Energy FM Cebu was previously on 90.7 FM from 1998 to 2003 and 89.1 FM under an airtime lease from 2003 to 2004.

In 2009, Energy FM Cebu won the "People's Choice" Award for Cebu FM Radio in the 18th KBP Golden Dove Awards.

References

Adult contemporary radio stations in the Philippines
Radio stations in Metro Cebu
Radio stations established in 1992